Warren Carther  (born 1951) is a Glass Artist based in Winnipeg, Manitoba. His educational background includes study in glass blowing at the Naples Mill School of Arts and Crafts, New York (1974), glass art at the California College of the Arts, as a student of Marvin Lipofsky. During his early career (1979-1986), Carther's love of architecture inspired him to create sculptural works that were not for architecture but were in homage to architecture. His international works are many, often featured in airports, corporate and government buildings. Carther is best known for his large-scale glass sculpture and innovative approach, including his creative use of dichromic glass, acid-etching and abrasive glass carving in his works. Most notable works include Chronos Trilogy, Hong Kong (1998) and Euphony, Anchorage International Airport, Alaska (2004). Carther's work has been published in many books and magazines, among them; International Glass Art by R. Yelle  and Colours of Architecture by A. Moore. His awards include; The Royal Architectural Institute of Canada's the Allied Arts Medal, Award of Excellence, the Allied Arts Medal (2007), and The Ontario Association of Architects Allied Arts Award, for innovative collaboration with an architect for the Canadian Embassy, Tokyo (1992).

Biography

Warren Carther's interest in glass as an art form began with blown glass. In 1977, while a student at the California College of the Arts, in Oakland California, Carther began to envision creating enormous walls of sculpted glass. He soon realized that the architectonic scale he was seeking was not possible at the end of a blowpipe, therefore in order to achieve the scale he desired, he would have to push glass in new ways, beyond what had been considered in the past. Thus began a long process of experimentation and discovery in technique and structure, which led to the work he currently creates. It is Carther's aesthetic vision, combined with an understanding and emphasis on the structural qualities of glass, which has enabled him to create sculptural works of unique form and immense scale. His interest in working large, sculpturally and within the architectural environment has led him to develop techniques which produce work that defies categorization and at times, blurs the boundaries between art and architecture.

Statement

Carther believes that art is an essential component of architecture and that the lives of human beings benefit significantly from art that they encounter in their daily lives. His understanding of this drives his desire to work in the architectural environment.

Carther's ambiguous, multi-layered themes serve to assist the architectural environment in defining a sense of place. All of his work addresses, in some way, the idea of the interdependence of human beings and nature.  They represent our innate desire to comprehend the world around us; to look beyond the rational and the visible; to reveal some essential truth about the world and our place in it.

Innovation

In 1972, when he first became intrigued with the notion of working in glass, it was not what he had seen that excited him but what it was what he had not seen.  At a time when all other art forms were changing, glass, it seemed to him, was not. He wondered why so few artists were exploring a material, which was capable of so much. After becoming aware of the, still very young, Studio Glass Movement in the USA (Studio glass), he studied glass blowing in New York (1974) and California (1975–1977), Carther returned to Canada to explore the material on his own.

He wanted to work sculpturally in glass on a very large scale and within architectural environments. Not wanting to accept the structural and aesthetic limitations of stained glass, he began experimenting with techniques such as acid etching and abrasive blast carving. In 1981, Carther came to the realization that he did not need lead at all, that if he worked with thicker ¾ inch plate glass, he could carve deeply into glass with abrasive blast and not compromise the structural capabilities of the glass, allowing him to work at almost any scale. He also began to fire glass enamel onto the plate for colour. This method of working became his primary technique.

History of work

North America

Canada

 2010, Winnipeg International Airport, Winnipeg, Canada                                                                                                                 
Carved glass sculpture, stacked glass technique, 12.2 ft. X 7.2 ft. X 3.4 ft.
 2007, Blue Cross Headquarters, Winnipeg, Canada
Carved Glass Wall, 15 Ft. X 9 Ft.
 2006,  Re-fit Health Centre, Winnipeg, Canada                                                                                                                    
Two Carved Glass Walls:  22Ft. X 6Ft. X 1.5Ft. 
 1999, Ottawa International Airport, Ottawa, Canada
Carved Glass Sculpture,  14 ft. X 12Ft. X 6Ft.
 1994, Investors Group - One Canada Centre, Winnipeg, Canada                                                                                        
Carved Glass Sculpture consisting of two towers of glass,  each 35 Ft. high X12 Ft.
 1986, Winnipeg Law Courts Building, Winnipeg, Canada 
8 courtroom entries - 16 Carved glass panels

United States

 2008, Sacred Heart Medical Center, Eugene, OR, USA
Carved Glass Panels, multiple panels, Total length: 52 ft. X 8 ft.
 2004, Anchorage International Airport, Anchorage, Alaska                                                                                                 
Carved Glass Sculpture consisting of nine towers of glass.    Total length: 135 Ft. Height: 27 Ft.
 2003, Orange County Convention Center, Orlando, Florida                                                                                                
Carved glass Wall,  25 Ft. X 15 Ft.
 2002, AstraZeneca Pharmaceuticals, US Corporate Headquarters, Wilmington, Delaware                                                 
Carved Glass Wall,  27 Ft. X  15 Ft.

Europe
England

 2015, The Canadian High Commission, London, UK
Carved sculptural glass panels, 12.5 Ft. X 6 Ft.

France

 2000, Charles de Gaulle Airport, Paris, France                                                                                                    
Reflective Carved Glass Wall: 100 Ft. X 6Ft.

Asia
Hong Kong
 1999, Swire Properties Ltd. Lincoln House, Hong Kong                                                                                                        
Three Carved Glass Sculptures located within one office tower: 40 ft. X12Ft. - 100Ft. X 27Ft. - 27Ft. X16Ft.

Japan
 1991, Canadian Embassy, Tokyo, Japan                                                                                                                                 
Carved, sculptural glass wall, 25Ft. X 22Ft.

Awards and distinctions

 Royal Architectural Institute of Canada (RAIC), 2007
 Award of Excellence - Allied Arts Medal
 Royal Canadian Academy of Arts (RCA), 2002
Elected to the academy
 The Saiyde Bronfman Award for Excellence in the Crafts, 2002, 1997, 1992, 1990, 1989
Five time nominee for Canada's most prestigious craft award.
 Ontario Association of Architects Allied Arts Award, 1992 
Received award for innovative collaboration with an architect, for the glass sculpture in the Canadian Embassy in Tokyo
 The American Craft Award, 1991
Received American Craft Award in architectural glass;  Received American Craft Merit Award in sculpture

Publications

Periodicals

Books
 Colours of Architecture, by Andrew Moor, Published by Mitchell Beazley, London, UK 
 A Celebration of Glass, by Kenneth vonRoenn Jr., Butler Books, USA
 International Glass Art  by Richard Wilfred Yelle, Schiffer Publishing, USA
 The Art of Glass  by Stephen Knapp, Rockport Press, USA
 Designing With Glass  (An International Survey) by Carol Soucek King, PBC International, Distributed by Rizzoli (U.S.) Hearst Corp (Overseas)
 Contemporary Stained Glass, by J. Russ and L. Lynne, Doubleday, Canada
 Creative Designs in Furniture, Kraus Sikes Inc., USA

Lectures

Carther is often invited to speak about his work and public art. He has spoken in Canada, the US and Australia. In June 2007, Carther spoke on transformations in the relationship between public art and glass in the late 20th and early 21st centuries when he presented a lecture to the Glass Art Society (GAS) in Pittsburgh, PA.

References

External links 
 cartherstudio.com

Canadian sculptors
Canadian male sculptors
1951 births
Living people
Canadian glass artists
Members of the Royal Canadian Academy of Arts